is a railway station on the Sanyō Main Line in Koi-honmachi, Nishi-ku, Hiroshima, operated by West Japan Railway Company (JR West).

Platforms

Adjacent stations

|-
!colspan=5|JR West

Hiroden
█ Main Line / █ Miyajima Line
Line #2
Fukushima-cho — Hiroden-nishi-hiroshima Station — Higashi-takasu
█ Main Line
Line #3
Hiroden-nishi-hiroshima Station — Higashi-takasu

Connecting bus routes
From "Koi(Nishi-Hiroshima) Bus Stop", there are Hiroden and Bon-Bus Bus routes.

Hiroden Bus
"Koi - Asahi-machi Route (Route 10)"
"Kogo Route"
"Misuzu, By-pass via Koi Route"
"Fujinoki - Hatchobori Night Bus Route"
"Yamada, Misuzu - Hiroshima Station Route"
"Yamada, Misuzu - Hiroshima Bus Center Route"
"Yamada - Hatchobori Route"
"Itsuki-gaoka - Hachobori Night Bus Route"

Bon-Bus
"Hiroden Koi-danchi Route"
"Osako-danchi Route"
"Kyoritsu-haitsu Route"
"Takasudai Route"
"Itsuki-gaoka Route"
"Fuji-haitsu - Ito-pia Route"

History
Opened as "Koi Station" of the Sanyo Railway Company in 1897.
Nationalized in 1906.
Station name changed to "Nishi-Hiroshima Station" in 1969.

See also

 List of railway stations in Japan

External links

  

Railway stations in Hiroshima Prefecture
Railway stations in Japan opened in 1897
Sanyō Main Line
Hiroshima City Network
Stations of West Japan Railway Company in Hiroshima city